Passio Olavi, more correctly Passio a miracule beati Olavi (The Passion and miracles of the Blessed Olaf) is a collection of legends about the Norwegian national saint Olaf II the Holy. The text was probably collected while Eysteinn Erlendsson was Archbishop of Nidaros (1159-1188), and is possibly written by Eysteinn himself. Egil Kraggerud dated the Passio Olavi to ca. 1150–1160.

The text is available in two versions, the more familiar long version is an Old Norse version of an Old Norwegian Homily Book, read on St Olaf's feast day (Olsok). A shorter version in Latin had wide distribution and is found in several places in Europe including : England, France, Austria and Finland. The long version is also known in an English manuscript from Fountains Abbey near York, which was the parent monastery of Lyse Abbey in Norway.

Editions
 
 
 
 2nd ed., Det Norske samlaget, 1970
 Facsimile edition. (with foreword by Arne Bakken). Det Norske samlaget, 1995. 
  - shorter version

References 

Olaf II of Norway
Old Norse literature
Christian hagiography